Crinipus marisa is a moth of the family Sesiidae first described by Herbert Druce in 1899. It is known from Malawi and South Africa.

References

Sesiidae
Lepidoptera of Malawi
Lepidoptera of South Africa
Moths of Sub-Saharan Africa
Moths described in 1899